Arcada Software, Inc., was a former American computer software company, that was based in California.

History
The company was formed in early 1994 by the merger of Conner Software (the software division of Conner Peripherals) in Lake Mary, Florida; and Astora Software (formerly Quest Development Corporation) in San Luis Obispo, California.

Conner Software owned the Backup Exec brand of backup software, while Quest owned the source code behind Symantec Corporation’s Norton Antivirus Backup for the DOS, Windows, and Macintosh computing platforms of the time.

In 1995, Arcada Software acquired the Sytron division of Rexon, to become a leader in the OS/2 market as well.

The Chief Executive Officer of Arcada Software was entrepreneur Kevin Azzouz, also the founder and President of Quest Development Corporation.

Fate
Arcada’s sales revenues grew exponentially over its two-year lifespan, until was acquired by Seagate Technologies in 1996.

Seagate then spun it and the other software companies it had acquired up to that time off into a wholly owned subsidiary called Seagate Software.

See also
 NTBackup

References

Defunct software companies of the United States
Software companies based in California
Software companies established in 1994
Software companies disestablished in 1996
1994 establishments in California
1996 disestablishments in California
Defunct companies based in California